The Waiotama River is a river of the Northland Region of New Zealand's North Island. It flows northwest from its origins south of Maungatapere to reach the Wairoa River 20 kilometres northeast of Dargaville.

See also
List of rivers of New Zealand

References

Rivers of the Northland Region
Rivers of New Zealand